a lake is an enclosed geographical body of fresh water.

Lake may also refer to:

 Lake pigment, a pigment manufactured by precipitating a dye with an inert binder, or "mordant", usually a metallic salt

People
 Lake (surname), includes a list of notable people with the surname
 Handsome Lake (1735–1815), Iroquois religious leader
 Lake Bell (born 1979), American actress
 Lake Speed (born 1948), American NASCAR driver
 Raven Lake, Canadian wrestler active 1993–2014, mother of Bambi Hall
 Lake (Infinity Train), a fictional character in the television series Infinity Train

Places
Greenland
 Lake Fjord
United Kingdom
 Lake, Isle of Wight
 Lake, Wiltshire
United States
 Lake, Idaho
 Lake, Kentucky
 Lake, Louisiana
 Lake, Maryland
 Lake, Michigan (disambiguation), several places
 Lake, Mississippi
 Lake, Missouri
 Lake, Oklahoma
 Lake, Virginia
 Lake, West Virginia
 Lake, Wisconsin (disambiguation), several places

Entertainment and media
 Lake (German band), a music group from Germany in the 1970s and 1980s
Lake (album), an album by the band
 Lake (American band), lo-fi pop band from Olympia, Washington state
 Lake (video game), a 2021 Narrative-adventure video game by Gamious
 WLKO, a radio station licensed to Hickory, North Carolina, United States which calls itself "102.9 the Lake"
 WMYI, a radio station licensed to Hendersonville, North Carolina, United States which calls itself "102.5 the Lake"

Other uses
 Lake Aircraft

See also
Lakes (disambiguation)
The Lake (disambiguation)
The Lakes (disambiguation)
Lake City (disambiguation)
Lake County (disambiguation)
Lake Creek (disambiguation)
Lake District (disambiguation)
Lake Forest (disambiguation)
Lake Park (disambiguation)
Lake Town (disambiguation)
Lake Township (disambiguation)
Justice Lake (disambiguation)